The West Australian Women's Football League (WAWFL) was the governing body of women's Australian rules football in the state of Western Australia from 1987 until its dissolution in 2021. 

History
The WAWFL football league was formed in 1987. The first season of competition was played in 1988 between four clubs, with a team from Mount Lawley winning the inaugural premiership. A second division was added from 2007 and the two divisions were later renamed "League" and "Reserves", the format most commonly used in Australian football leagues.

Clubs
During the history of the league, some clubs which were originally formed independently have become associated with the clubs competing in the men's Western Australian Football League. The current clubs are:

Premierships
Division 1
 2018  East Fremantle Sharks
 2017  Swan Districts
 2016  Swan Districts
 2015  Coastal Titans
 2014  Swan Districts
 2013  Swan Districts
 2012  Coastal Titans
 2011  East Fremantle Sharks
 2010  Coastal Titans
 2009  East Fremantle Sharks
 2008  Coastal Titans
 2007  Melville Sharks
 2006  Coastal Titans
 2005  Coastal Titans
 2004  Coastal Titans
 2003  Southern Thunder
 2002  Melville
 2001  Innaloo
 2000  Innaloo
 1999  Innaloo
 1998  Belmont
 1997  Belmont
 1996  Innaloo
 1995  Innaloo
 1994  Vic Park
 1993  Vic Park
 1992  Carlisle
 1991  Melville
 1990  Melville
 1989  Carlisle
 1988  Mt Lawley

Division 2 (formerly Reserves)
 2017  Swan Districts
 2016  Joondalup Falcons
 2015  Claremont
 2014  Coastal Titans
 2013  Swan Districts
 2012  Claremont  Piranhas
 2011  SNESA Angels 
 2010  Peel Thunderbirds
 2009  South Fremantle Bulldogs
 2008  Coastal Titans
 2007  Joondalup Falcons

Honours
Fairest and Best
The Medal is awarded to the best and fairest overall of the season as determined by the Umpires. This prestigious award is presented to the recipient at the end of season Presentation Dinner.
1988 –	Kara Graham	(Innaloo)
1989 –	Karen Cooper	(Carlisle)
1990 –	Kara Graham	(Innaloo)
1991 –	Larissa Ukich	(Melville)
1992 –	Dhara Kerr	(Innaloo); Kelley Lutey	(Carlisle)
1993 –	Dhara Kerr	(Innaloo)
1994 –	Dhara Kerr	(Innaloo)
1995 –	Kylie Hodges	(Vic Park)
1996 –	Tammy Licence	(Melville)
1997 –	Louise Knitter	(Koonga Valley)
1998 –	Amanda Crean	(UWA)
1999 –	Amanda Crean	(UWA)
2000 –	Amanda Crean	(UWA)
2001 –	Priscilla Harry	(Southern Thunder)
2002 –	Deanne Coates	(Innaloo)
2003 –	Louise Knitter	(Forrestfield)
2004 –	Louise Knitter	(Forrestfield)
2005 –	Louise Knitter	(Forrestfield)
2006 – Belinda Bentley  (Melville)
2007 – Louise Knitter (Gosnells); Shelley Matcham (Melville)
2008 – Deanne Coates  (Coastal Titans)
2009 – Deanne Coates  (Coastal Titans); Kiara Bowers  (Southern River)
2010 – Melissa Caulfield  (Southern River)
2011 – Melissa Caulfield  (East Fremantle)
2012 –	Lauren Stammers  (Coastal Titans)
2013 – Kiara Bowers  (Coastal Titans); Chelsea Randall (Swan Districts)
2014 –	Kiara Bowers (Coastal Titans)
2015 –	Kiara Bowers (Coastal Titans)
2016 –	Kiara Bowers (Coastal Titans); Emma King (Coastal Titans) 
2017 –	Jodie White (Coastal Titans)
2018 – Hayley Miller (Subiaco)

Jo-anne Huggins Leading Goal Kickers

1990 – Kelley Lutey	(Carlisle)
1991 – Janice Woods	(Carlisle)
1992 – Kelley Lutey	(Carlisle)
1993 – Karen Cooper	(Vic Park)
1994 – Susan Daly	(Innaloo)
1995 – Kelley Lutey	(Vic Park)
1996 – Vanessa Chrisp    (Innaloo)
1997 – Cindy Farinosi	(Innaloo)
1998 – Nicole George	(Belmont)
1999 – Nicole George	(Belmont); Denise Wallace    (Melville)
2000 – Denise Wallace	(Melville)
2001 – Joanne Hartley    9Southern Thunder)
2002 – Danielle Fagents	(Innaloo)
2003 – Jodie Shuttleworth(Innaloo)
2004 – Charlene Headland	(Southern Thunder)
2005 – Natalie McDonald	(Coastal Titans)
2006 – Krystal Rivers   9Coastal Titans)
2007 – Loren Fricker   (Coastal Titans)
2008 – Loren Fricker   (Coastal Titans)
2009 – Loren Fricker   (Coastal Titans)
2010 – Ashlee Atkins  (Swan Districts)
2011 – Amber Steiber (East Fremantle); Melissa Caulfield (East Fremantle)
 2012 –	Kiara Bowers (Coastal Titans) 
 2013 –	Trisha Ramsay (Coastal Titans)
 2014 –	Trisha Ramsay (Coastal Titans)
 2015 –	Trisha Ramsay (Coastal Titans)
 2016 –	Amy Lavell (Coastal Titans)
 2017 –	Kira Phillips (Peel)
 2018 –	Kira Phillips (Peel)

Cath Boyce Rookie of the Year
1995 – Mel Hicks	        (Canning)
1996 – Tammy Licence	(Melville)
1997 – Amanda Crean	(UWA)
1998 – Cherie Bambury	(Belmont)
1999 – Samantha Winslow	(Melville)
2000 – Karen Cowley	(Innaloo)
2001 – Alana Duffus	(Southern Thunder)
2002 – Jane Davis	(Melville)
2003 – Catherine Young	(Forrestfield)
2004 – Emma Burgess 	(Southern Thunder)
2005 – Rachael Russell	(Melville)
2006 – Not awarded
2007 – Shelley Matcham  (Melville)
2008 – Nicole Bolten   (Coastal Titans)
2009 – Melissa Caulfield  (Southern River)
2010 – Linnea Mansson (Claremont)
2011 – Kahra Sprlyan (South Fremantle)
2012 – Ashleigh Brazill (East Fremantle)
2013 – Lara Filocamo  (Claremont)
2014 – Not awarded
2015 – Erin Fox  (East Fremantle)
2016 – Jasmin Stewart   (Claremont)
2017 – Sabreena Duffy  (Peel Thunderbirds)
2018 – Jayme Harken (Subiaco)

Life members

1994 – Cath Boyce
1995 – Sharon Woods
1996 – Barbara Hampson
1997 – Jo-Anne Huggins
1997 – Kerryn Wood
2000 – Debbie White
2001 – Charmaine Rogers
2002 – Lynette (Smith) Geaney
2016 – Nikki Harwood
2018 – Carolyn Hills

See also

List of Australian rules football women's leagues

References

External links

Women's Australian rules football leagues in Australia
Australian rules football competitions in Western Australia
Sports leagues established in 1988
1988 establishments in Australia
Women's Australian rules football governing bodies